

Incumbent
Lord: John

Events

Giraldus Cambrensis (Gerald of Wales) writes Expugnato Hibernica about Henry II’s invasion of Ireland.
 Royal charter was granted to Dundalk
 Hugh de Lacy, 1st Earl of Ulster was appointed Viceroy of Ireland

Births

Deaths
  King Conchobar Maenmaige Ua Conchobair of Connacht was assassinated.

References